Längsee is a lake of Tyrol, Austria.

See also
 Egelsee (Tyrol)
 Hechtsee

Lakes of Tyrol (state)
Kufstein